Hypocrita hystaspes is a moth of the family Erebidae. It was described by Arthur Gardiner Butler in 1871. It is found in Venezuela.

References

 Arctiidae genus list at Butterflies and Moths of the World of the Natural History Museum

Hypocrita
Moths described in 1871